Täljehallen, is an indoor arena for basketball matches, in Södertälje, Sweden. It has a capacity of 2,100 spectators.

Notable sports events held in the arena 
 2009 FIBA Europe Under-18 Women's Championship

Indoor arenas in Sweden
Buildings and structures in Stockholm County
Basketball venues in Sweden